Carlo Grano (14 October 1887 – 2 April 1976) was an Italian cardinal of the Roman Catholic Church who served as Apostolic Nuncio to Italy from 1958 to 1967, and was raised to the rank of cardinal in 1967.

Biography
Born in Rome, Grano attended the Pontifical Roman Seminary before studying philosophy, theology, and canon law at the Pontifical Roman Athenaeum S. Apollinare. He was ordained to the priesthood by Archbishop Giuseppe Ceppetelli on 14 June 1912, and then did pastoral work in Rome until 1920. Grano was named a pontifical ceremonery supernumerary on 23 January 1920, and also served as a staff member (1923–1945), chief of protocol (1945–1953), and Substitute (1953–1958) of the Vatican Secretariat of State.

On 13 December 1958, Grano was appointed Apostolic Nuncio to Italy and Titular Archbishop of Thessalonica. He received his episcopal consecration on the following 27 December from Pope John XXIII himself, with Bishops Girolamo Bortignon, OFM Cap, and Gioacchino Muccin serving as co-consecrators, in St. Peter's Basilica. Grano later attended the Second Vatican Council from 1962 to 1965.

Pope Paul VI created him Cardinal-Priest of San Marcello al Corso in the consistory of 26 June 1967. Grano lost his right to participate in a papal conclave upon reaching the age of 80 on 1 January 1971.

Cardinal Grano died in his native Rome, at age 88. He is buried in San Marcello al Corso.

Honours and awards
 Grand Officer of the Order of Merit of the Italian Republic (1953)
 Grand Cross of the Order of Merit of the Federal Republic of Germany (1953)
 Grand Cross of the Order of Merit of the Italian Republic (1954)
 Grand Decoration of Honour in Silver with Sash for Services to the Republic of Austria (1958)

References

External links
Catholic-Hierarchy
Cardinals of the Holy Roman Church

1887 births
1976 deaths
Clergy from Rome
20th-century Italian cardinals
Diplomats of the Holy See
Participants in the Second Vatican Council
Cardinals created by Pope Paul VI
Grand Crosses 1st class of the Order of Merit of the Federal Republic of Germany
Knights Grand Cross of the Order of Merit of the Italian Republic
Recipients of the Grand Decoration with Sash for Services to the Republic of Austria
Pontifical Roman Seminary alumni